Fort Clarence (formerly the Eastern Battery) was a British coastal fort built in 1754 at the beginning of the French and Indian War in Dartmouth, Nova Scotia, Canada. The battery was built on the grant of Capt. John Rous. Initially it had 8 guns mounted. In spring 1759, a Mi'kmaq attack on the Eastern Battery killed five soldiers.

On 17 November 1778, the King's Orange Rangers arrived by sea at Halifax. The reason for the transfer was probably to stem desertions by relocating the men to a place much farther away from their homes. The KOR was assigned to protect the Eastern Battery on the shore of Halifax harbour at the south end of Woodside, where the neighborhood of Imperoyal now exists.

Eastern Battery was renamed Fort Clarence by Prince Edward on 20 October 1798 in honor of his brother, the Duke of Clarence and St. Andrews, later King William IV. In the late 1790s, a Martello tower replaced the blockhouse. The fort was rebuilt with stone in the 1860s.

In 1929, Imperial Oil purchased the site which became part of its Dartmouth Refinery and the remaining parts of the fort were buried in the 1940s. The refinery was converted to an oil storage depot in 2013 and archeologists are calling for the fort to be excavated.

See also 
 Military history of Nova Scotia
 Military history of the Mi’kmaq people
 Royal Naval Dockyard, Halifax

References

Further reading
 John G. Leefe, "History of the Royal Provincial Regiment King's Orange Rangers
 Mrs. William Lawson, "The History of The Townships of Dartmouth, Preston and Lawrencetown, Halifax County, Nova Scotia", p. 16

External links 
 Fort Clarence
 Images of Fort Clarence during American Civil War

Military history of Nova Scotia
History of Halifax, Nova Scotia
Military forts in Nova Scotia